Spectres is the fifth studio album by American hard rock band Blue Öyster Cult, released in November 1977. The album features one of the band's biggest hits, concert staple "Godzilla," and was certified gold in January 1978.

Record World called the single "Goin' Through the Motions," which was co-written by Mott the Hoople singer Ian Hunter, a "thumping, hand-clapping pop-rocker"

The cover art features Blue Öyster Cult's use of lasers in their live show at that time. A remastered version was released on February 13, 2007, which included four previously unreleased outtakes from the Spectres sessions as bonus tracks.

Track listing

Personnel
Blue Öyster Cult
Eric Bloom – stun guitar, vocals
Donald "Buck Dharma" Roeser – lead guitar, vocals
Allen Lanier – keyboards, rhythm guitar, vocals
Joe Bouchard – bass, vocals, keyboards
Albert Bouchard – drums, harmonica, percussion, vocals

Additional musicians
Newark Boys Chorus – vocals on "Golden Age of Leather"

Production
Murray Krugman, Sandy Pearlman, David Lucas – producers       
Shelly Yakus – engineer, mixing
John Jansen, Corky Stasiak, Thom Panunzio, Andy Abrams – engineers
Gray Russell, Dave Thoener, Jay Krugman, Rod O’Brien, Sam Ginsberg – assistant engineers
Joe Brescio – mastering
Roni Hoffman – design
Eric Meola – photos
David Infante – laser effects and photo assistance

Charts

Certifications

References 

1977 albums
Albums produced by Murray Krugman
Albums produced by Sandy Pearlman
Albums recorded at Record Plant (New York City)
Blue Öyster Cult albums
Columbia Records albums
Nosferatu